Hans Hunziker is a retired Swiss slalom canoeist who competed in the late 1960s. He won a bronze medal in the K-1 event at the 1967 ICF Canoe Slalom World Championships in Lipno nad Vltavou.

References

Living people
Swiss male canoeists
Year of birth missing (living people)
Medalists at the ICF Canoe Slalom World Championships